In heraldry, an escutcheon is a shield that forms the main or focal element in an achievement of arms. The word can be used in two related senses. In the first sense, an escutcheon is the shield upon which a coat of arms is displayed. In the second sense, an escutcheon can itself be a charge within a coat of arms.

Escutcheon shapes are derived from actual shields that were used by knights in combat, and thus are varied and developed by region and by era. Since shields have been regarded as military equipment appropriate for men only, British ladies customarily bear their arms upon a lozenge, or diamond-shape, while clergymen and ladies in continental Europe bear their arms upon a cartouche, or oval. Other shapes are also in use, such as the roundel commonly used for arms granted to Aboriginal Canadians by the Canadian Heraldic Authority, or the Nguni shield used in African heraldry (likewise, Christian organisations and Masonic bodies tend to use the same shape, also known as a vesica piscis).

Although an escutcheon can be used as a charge on its own, the most common use of an escutcheon charge is to display another coat of arms as a form of marshalling. Such escutcheon charges are usually given the same shape as the main shield. When there is only one escutcheon charge, it is sometimes called an inescutcheon.

The word escutcheon (late 15th century) is based on Old North French escuchon ('shield').

Shapes

The earliest depictions of proto-heraldic shields in the second half of the 12th century still have the shape of the Norman kite shield used throughout the 11th and 12th centuries. By about the 1230s, shields used by heavy cavalry had become shorter and more triangular, now called heater shields.

Transitional forms intermediate between kite and heater are seen in the late 12th to early 13th centuries. Transition to the heater was essentially complete by 1250. For example, the shield of William II Longespée (d. 1250) shown with his effigy at Salisbury Cathedral is triangular, while the shield shown on the effigy of his father William Longespée, 3rd Earl of Salisbury (d. 1226) is still of a more elongated form.

The shield on the enamel monument to Geoffrey V, Count of Anjou (d. 1151) is of almost full-body length. 
The heater was used in warfare during the apogee of the Age of Chivalry, at about the time of the Battle of Crecy (1346) and the founding of the Order of the Garter (1348). The shape is therefore used in armorials from this "classical age" of heraldry.

Beginning in the 15th century, and even more throughout the early modern period, a great variety of escutcheon shapes develops.
In the Tudor era the heraldic escutcheon became more square, taking the shape of an inverted Tudor arch. Continental European designs frequently use the various forms used in jousting, which incorporate "mouths" used as lance rests into the shields; such escutcheons are known as à bouche. The mouth is correctly shown on the dexter side only, as jousting pitches were designed for right-handed knights. Heraldic examples of English shields à bouche can be seen in the spandrels of the trussed timber roof of Lincoln's Inn Hall, London.

The shape of the top, the sides and the base may be separately described, and these elements may be freely combined. The highly complex Baroque style shields of the 17th century come in many artistic variations.

Lozenge

In English heraldry, the lozenge has been used by women since the 13th century for the display of their coats of arms instead of the escutcheon or shield, which are associated with warfare. In this case the lozenge is shown without crest or helm. For the practical purpose of categorisation the lozenge may be treated as a variety of heraldic escutcheon.

Traditionally, very limited categories of females have been able to display their own arms, for example a female monarch—who uses an escutcheon as a military commander, not a lozenge—and suo jure peeresses, who may display their own arms alone on a lozenge even if married.
In general a female was represented by her paternal arms impaled by the arms of her husband on an escutcheon as a form of marshalling.

In modern Canadian heraldry, and certain other modern heraldic jurisdictions, women may be granted their own arms and display these on an escutcheon. 
Life peeresses in England display their arms on a lozenge.
An oval or cartouche is occasionally also used instead of the lozenge for armigerous women.

As a result of rulings of the English Kings of Arms dated 7 April 1995 and 6 November 1997, married women in England, Northern Ireland and Wales and in other countries recognising the jurisdiction of the College of Arms in London (such as New Zealand) also have the option of using their husband's arms alone, marked with a small lozenge as a difference to show that the arms are displayed for the wife and not the husband; or of using their own personal arms alone, marked with a small shield as a brisure for the same reason.
Divorced women may theoretically until remarriage use their ex-husband's arms differenced with a mascle.
Widowed women normally display a lozenge-shaped shield impaled, unless they are heraldic heiresses, in which case they display a lozenge-shaped shield with the unaltered escutcheon of pretence in the centre. Women in same-sex marriages may use a shield or banner to combine arms, but can use only a lozenge or banner when one of the spouses dies.

Points
The points of the shield refer to specific positions thereon and are used in blazons to describe where a charge should be placed.

Inescutcheon

An inescutcheon is a smaller escutcheon that is placed within or superimposed over the main shield of a coat of arms. This may be used in the following cases:
as a simple mobile charge, for example as borne by the French family of Abbeville, illustrated below; these may also bear other charges upon them, as shown in the arms of the Swedish Collegium of Arms, illustrated below;
in pretence (as a mark of a hereditary claim, usually by right of marriage), bearing assumed arms over one's own hereditary arms;
in territorial claim, bearing a monarch's hereditary arms en surtout over the territorial arms of his domains.

Inescutcheons as mobile charges
Inescutcheons may appear in personal and civic armory as simple mobile charges, for example the arms of the House of Mortimer, the Clan Hay or the noble French family of Abbeville. These mobile charges are of a particular tincture but do not necessarily bear further charges and may appear anywhere on the main escutcheon, their placement being specified in the blazon, if in doubt.

Inescutcheons may also be charged with other mobile charges, such as in the arms of the Swedish Collegium of Arms (illustrated above) which bears the three crowns of Sweden, each upon its own escutcheon upon the field of the main shield. These inescutcheons serve as a basis for including other charges that do not serve as an augmentation or hereditary claim. In this case, the  inescutcheons azure allow the three crowns of Sweden to be placed upon a field, thus not only remaining clearly visible but also conforming to the rule of tincture.

Inescutcheon of pretence
Inescutcheons may also be used to bear another's arms in "pretence". In English heraldry the husband of a heraldic heiress, the sole daughter and heiress of an armigerous man (i.e. a lady without any brothers), rather than impaling his wife's paternal arms as is usual, must place her paternal arms in an escutcheon of pretence in the centre of his own shield as a claim ("pretence") to be the new head of his wife's family, now extinct in the male line. In the next generation the arms are quartered by the son.

Use by monarchs and states
A monarch's personal or hereditary arms may be borne on an inescutcheon en surtout over the territorial arms of his/her domains, as in the arms of Spain, the coats of arms of the Danish Royal Family members, the greater coat of arms of Sweden, or the arms of Oliver Cromwell as Lord Protector of the Commonwealth of England (1653–1659). The early Georgian kings of England bore an inescutcheon of the royal arms of Hanover on the arms of the Stuart monarchs of Great Britain, whose territories they now ruled.

Pelta escutcheon

The current diplomatic emblem of France incorporates the pelta escutcheon, a wide form of shield (or gorget) with a small animal head pointing inward at each end.
This is Roman in origin; although not the shape of their classic shield, many brooches of this shape survive from antiquity.
A form of pelta appears as a decoration above the head of every official on the Austerlitz table, commissioned by Napoleon for propaganda purposes.

Console

The term "console" in architecture is generally used for elements which provide support, such as corbels on a console table. A console in heraldry is a decorative frame or support, generally in an architectural or illustrative context, surrounding a heraldic shield or escutcheon, which serves to add interest to and mitigate the harshness of the stark outline of the shield.

Notes

References

Further reading

 

Heraldry
Shields